Huddersfield is a constituency represented in the House of Commons of the UK Parliament since 1983 by Barry Sheerman of Labour Co-op.

Boundaries 

1983–2010: The Borough of Kirklees wards of Almondbury, Birkby, Dalton, Deighton, Newsome, and Paddock.

2010–present: The Borough of Kirklees wards of Almondbury, Ashbrow, Dalton, Greenhead, and Newsome.

Constituency profile
This constituency covers the urban centre and east of the West Yorkshire town of Huddersfield, the administrative centre of the Metropolitan Borough of Kirklees. The town grew out of the former wooden industry, and is now a primarily residential market town with some light industry remaining in the town such as Syngenta and Cummins, and a growing number of students at the University of Huddersfield. The town is economically diverse with some deprived inner-city council estates, and on the outskirts, such as Fixby, some exclusive detached stone houses in leafy roads. However the town’s most affluent western suburbs such as Lindley are actually in the neighbouring Colne Valley constituency.

Apart from four years tenure as MP by Geoffrey Dickens for Huddersfield West (1979-1983), the area (including its divided halves for the 33 years to 1983) has returned a Labour Party MP since 1945.

The constituency is currently held by the Labour Party, although the Liberal Democrats made inroads by coming second in the 2005 general election, and in the 2010 general election Karen Tween of the Conservative Party narrowed the incumbent's lead to a relatively average 4,472 votes and the new Liberal Democrat candidate slipped into third place. There are currently Green Party councillors in Newsome, and some Tory and Liberal Democrat councillors in Almondbury, but the remaining wards are safely Labour. The Dalton ward also includes the village of Kirkheaton, separated by a green buffer, and the Almondbury ward includes the small village of Lepton, West Yorkshire.

Members of Parliament

Elections

Elections in the 2010s

Elections in the 2000s

Elections in the 1990s

Elections in the 1980s

Elections in the 1940s 

General Election 1939–40:

Another general election was required to take place before the end of 1940. The political parties had been making preparations for an election to take place from 1939 and by the end of this year, the following candidates had been selected; 
Liberal National: William Mabane
Labour: Joseph Mallalieu
Liberal: Elliott Dodds

Elections in the 1930s

Elections in the 1920s

Elections in the 1910s 

General Election 1914–15:

Another General Election was required to take place before the end of 1915. The political parties had been making preparations for an election to take place and by the July 1914, the following candidates had been selected; 
Liberal: Arthur Sherwell
Unionist: 
Socialist: Harry Snell (candidature not approved by Labour Party National Executive)

Elections in the 1900s

Elections in the 1890s 

 Caused by Summers' death.

Elections in the 1880s

Elections in the 1870s

Elections in the 1860s

 Caused by Crosland's death.

Elections in the 1850s

 Caused by Stansfield's election being declared void on petition due to bribery and treating which "prevailed to a great extent".

Elections in the 1840s

Elections in the 1830s

 Caused by Blackburne's death

 Caused by Fenton's death. While Ramsden was not a candidate, a local spirit merchant, Paul Hirst, voted for him.

See also 
 List of parliamentary constituencies in West Yorkshire

Notes

References

Parliamentary constituencies in Yorkshire and the Humber
Constituencies of the Parliament of the United Kingdom established in 1832
Constituencies of the Parliament of the United Kingdom disestablished in 1950
Constituencies of the Parliament of the United Kingdom established in 1983
Politics of Huddersfield